Hofireh-ye Olya (also known as Ḩīfereh-ye Bālā and Ḩīfereh-ye ‘Olyā) is a village in Abdoliyeh-ye Gharbi Rural District, in the Central District of Ramshir County, Khuzestan Province, Iran. At the 2006 census, its population was 136, in 22 families.

References 

Populated places in Ramshir County